The Church of St Dyfnog, Llanrhaeadr-yng-Nghinmeirch, Denbighshire, Wales, is a parish church dating from the 13th century. The church is most famous for its Tree of Jesse window which dates from 1533. The church is a Grade I listed building.

Saint Dyfnog
Dyfnog was the son of Medrod ab Caradog Freichfas and a brother of the grandfather of Cwyfen, coming to the area from North Britain. He built a small wooden church on the property which is now the Church of St Dyfnog in Llanrhaeadr.

History
The first mentions of the church occur in the Norwich Taxatio Ecclesiastica of 1254 and the Lincolnshire Taxatio of 1291. The South chamber and the door of the tower may both date from this time. The "particularly fine enriched roofs" are later, dating from re-modellings in the 15th and 16th centuries. The Jesse window, the church's most famous feature, dates from 1533. The window is reputed to have been removed and buried during the English Civil war to protect it from destruction. It was re-instated in 1661. The church suffered at the hands of Victorian restorers; Arthur Baker's restoration of 1879–1880 is described as "indifferent" by Cadw and as "inappropriate" in the Clwyd volume of The Buildings of Wales.
The church remains an active parish church within the Mission Area of Denbigh.

Architecture and description

The church is constructed of limestone rubble with sandstone dressings and slate roofs. It has a double nave, a South chamber and a four-storey tower. The architectural historian Edward Hubbard notes the style as Perpendicular, with the possible exception of the tower door.

The interior contains a "wonderfully complete" Tree of Jesse window, described by Cadw as "the apogee of the early Tudor North Wales school of glazing". The window, showing Jesus's descent from Jesse, has been called "the finest Glass window in all Wales, exceeded by few in England".

The church also contains a number of significant monuments to local grandees including those of Watkin Edwards Wynne and Maurice Jones, the latter "large and Baroque, (a) reclining bewigged effigy". There is also a rare carved pelican, dated 1792, shown feeding its young with its blood. The church is a Grade I listed building, the listing recording it as "an exceptionally fine late medieval church (with) the famous Jesse window".

Notes

References
 

Grade I listed churches in Denbighshire
History of Denbighshire
Church in Wales church buildings
13th-century church buildings in Wales